21c (or 21st century) is a weekly Canadian newsmagazine television series for teens which aired on CTV from 2001 until 2004. The show was hosted by Dominic Patten and Anne-Marie Mediwake who presented topics related to teen issues.
Show producers include:
 Mike Sheerin
 Derek Miller
 Dorothy Dickie
 Ilana Banks
 Bree Tiffin
 Akua Otupiri

External links
 Source information

2001 Canadian television series debuts
2004 Canadian television series endings
2000s Canadian children's television series
CTV Television Network original programming
2000s Canadian documentary television series